Kandleria is a genus from the family of Erysipelotrichidae, with one known species (Kandleria vitulina).

References

Further reading 
 

Coprobacillaceae
Monotypic bacteria genera
Bacteria genera